The Guiberson Fire was a wildfire that burned from September 22 until September 27, 2009 in Guiberson Canyon of the western Santa Susana Mountains, between Fillmore and Moorpark in Ventura County, California.

The fire
The Guiberson Fire, which started between Fillmore and Moorpark, caused the evacuation of almost 600 homes in Meridian Hills and Bardsdale with about 1,000 structures threatened, in addition to oil pipelines in the area. The cause of the fire is still unknown.

The fire destroyed an estimated , destroying an outbuilding and injuring 10 firefighters. On day two of the fire Governor Schwarzenegger declared a state of emergency.

See also
2009 California wildfires

References

2009 California wildfires
Wildfires in Ventura County, California
Santa Susana Mountains
Fillmore, California
Moorpark, California